Rodrigo Martín Muñoz Salomón (born 22 January 1982) is a Uruguayan footballer and Paraguayan who plays as a goalkeeper  and captains the Paraguayan Primera División club Guarani.

Club career

Cerro
Muñoz played for Cerro from 2002 to 2008, scoring 4 goals.

Nacional
In 2009, he was transferred to Club Nacional de Football, making his debut in a 2-1 home win against Universidad San Martín de Porres in the 2009 Copa Libertadores on February 12, 2009. With Nacional he won the Uruguayan championship twice (2009 & 2011).

Libertad
In January 2012, he signed a new deal with the Paraguayan side Libertad.

International career
On May 18, 2011 he was reserved to play a friendly match against Germany in Sinsheim. Muñoz was named in Uruguay's provisional squad for Copa América Centenario but was cut from the final squad.

Honours
Nacional
Uruguayan Primera División (2): 2008–09, 2010-11

References

External links
 
 

1982 births
Living people
Uruguayan footballers
Uruguayan expatriate footballers
Association football goalkeepers
Uruguayan Primera División players
Paraguayan Primera División players
Club Nacional de Football players
C.A. Cerro players
Club Libertad footballers
Expatriate footballers in Paraguay
2014 FIFA World Cup players
2015 Copa América players
Cerro Porteño players
Club Guaraní players